The 2003 Philippine Basketball Association (PBA) Samsung-Invitational Championship, was the second conference of the 2003 PBA season. It started on July 27 and ended on August 23, 2003. The tournament features three guest foreign teams from Korea, China and Yugoslavia along with the Philippine national team.

The Alaska Aces captured their 11th PBA title by beating the Coca Cola Tigers, 2-1, in their best-of-three finals series.

Brandon Cablay won on his first Finals MVP in Invitational Cup Championship.

Qualification

PBA Philippine Cup 

 Top 5 teams qualify outright
 Bottom 5 teams proceed to last chance qualifying via Mabuhay Cup

Samsung-PBA Mabuhay Cup
The Samsung PBA-Mabuhay Cup was the one-round robin between the five lower seeded teams based on their won-loss records in the elimination round of the All-Filipino Cup to determine the sixth and last qualifying team for the PBA second conference Invitationals.

The Alaska Aces made it as the sixth entry by defeating Barangay Ginebra Kings on July 20 at the Cuneta Astrodome for a perfect 4-0 slate.

Elimination round

Group A
Red Bull gained the last slot in the crossover semis on August 13 at the Cuneta Astrodome in a bizarre ending, Talk 'N Text, which won 88-87, needed to win 8 points, went to the extent of shooting to the Red Bull's goal while enjoying the lead in the closing seconds to possibly force an overtime.

Group B

Bracket

Semifinals

Third place playoff

Finals

Brandon Lee Cablay held the Aces together with timely hits then sparked a fiery Alaska windup as the Tigers came back from 16 points down to even lead twice early in the last quarter. Cablay nailed a three-pointer that tied the count for the final time at 70-all and added back-to-back baskets that finally doomed the Tigers, 84-74, with 2:24 left in the game. The 6-foot Cablay was adjudged as the first rookie Finals MVP since Danny Seigle with San Miguel back in 1999.

References

External links
PBA.ph

Invitational Championship
2003
2003–04 in Serbian basketball
2003–04 in Chinese basketball
2003–04 in South Korean basketball